Bennett Troy Jackson, Jr. (born September 16, 1991) is an American football safety who is a free agent. He was drafted by the New York Giants in the sixth round of the 2014 NFL Draft. He played college football at Notre Dame.

High school
Jackson grew up in Hazlet, New Jersey, where he attended Raritan High School. He recorded 40 receptions for 729 yards and rushed 20 times for 350 yards as senior in 2010. He also played defensive back and intercepted four passes in 2009, helping lead Raritan to 8–3 record in 2009. He caught 35 passes for 509 yards with four touchdowns during his junior season in 2008 and rushed 35 times for 267 yards and four touchdowns. He added two passing touchdowns, two punt returns for touchdowns and one kickoff return for a score during his junior season, averaging 38 yards per kickoff return and 18 yards per punt return in 2008.

He also competed in track and field as sprinter and a hurdler. He was a specialist in the 110 meter hurdles, he ran a personal best of 13.75 seconds. He also competed in the 100 meters, 200 meters and 400 meters, posting personal bests of 10.82 seconds, 21.73 seconds and 49.36 seconds, respectively.

Considered a three-star recruit by Rivals.com, he was rated as the 61st best wide receiver in the nation. He committed to Notre Dame over offers from Michigan State, Rutgers and Northwestern.

College career
Jackson began his career at wide receiver playing mostly on special teams as a freshman in 2010. He recorded ten total tackles and had one carry for twenty yards. In 2011, after converting to cornerback in spring practice, playing mostly on special teams and as a backup, he recorded 18 tackles. In his junior season in 2012, he started all 13 games. He recorded 65 total tackles, including one and a half for loss, four interceptions and four pass break ups while playing the entire season with a torn labrum in his right shoulder. In 2013, as a senior, he recorded 64 tackles, including five for loss, one sack, one forced fumble, two interceptions and three pass breakups.

Professional career

New York Giants
Jackson was drafted by the New York Giants in the sixth round (187th overall) of the 2014 NFL Draft.

He signed his rookie contract with the Giants on May 19, 2014. He was cut on August 30, 2014 as part of the cutdown to 53 players, but was assigned to the practice squad the next day. In the beginning of the 2015 NFL Season, the Giants announced that Jackson will be moving from cornerback to safety. On August 22, 2015, Jackson suffered a torn ACL in the Giants' second preseason game and missed the rest of the season. On September 1, 2015, he was placed on injured reserve by the Giants.

On August 30, 2016, Jackson was released by the Giants.

Baltimore Ravens
On January 3, 2018, Jackson signed a reserve/future contract with the Baltimore Ravens. He was placed on injured reserve on August 31, 2018. He was released on September 6, 2018. He was re-signed to the practice squad on November 27, 2018. He signed a reserve/future contract with the Ravens on January 8, 2019.

On August 31, 2019, Jackson was waived by the Ravens.

New York Jets
On September 1, 2019, Jackson was claimed off waivers by the New York Jets. He was waived on September 16, 2019 and re-signed to the practice squad.

Baltimore Ravens (second stint)
On October 15, 2019, Jackson was signed by the Baltimore Ravens off the Jets practice squad. He was waived on December 2, 2019.

New York Jets (second stint)
On December 3, 2019, Jackson was claimed off waivers by the New York Jets.

On March 25, 2020, Jackson was re-signed by the Jets. He was released on September 5, 2020, and signed to the practice squad the next day. He was promoted to the active roster on November 3, 2020. He was placed on injured reserve on December 12, 2020.

Jackson re-signed with the Jets again on April 8, 2021. He was waived on August 17, 2021. Jackson was re-signed on August 20, 2021. He was released on August 30, 2021.

References

External links

Notre Dame Fighting Irish bio

1991 births
Living people
American football cornerbacks
New York Jets players
Baltimore Ravens players
New York Giants players
Notre Dame Fighting Irish football players
People from Hazlet, New Jersey
Players of American football from New Jersey
Sportspeople from Monmouth County, New Jersey